The Dajabón River (also called Massacre River) is a river which forms the northernmost part of the international border between the Dominican Republic and Haiti.

The river got the name "Massacre River" because it was the site of the killing of thirty French buccaneers by Spanish settlers in 1728. The name became newly popular after being the site of many killings during the Parsley Massacre—though the event was not, contrary to popular belief, the origin of its name.

See also
List of rivers of the Dominican Republic

References

 The Columbia Gazetteer of North America. 2000.
CIA map

Rivers of the Dominican Republic
Rivers of Haiti
International rivers of North America
Dominican Republic–Haiti border
Border rivers